Ali James (born 11 October 1979 in Rugby, Warwickshire) is an English rugby union footballer, currently playing for Esher. A product of the Gloucester Rugby Academy, he moved to Newbury before rejoining Gloucester Rugby in the summer of 2007.  He plays as a centre.  During the 2007/08 season he played for Moseley as a loan player.

External links
Gloucester Rugby profile

1979 births
Living people
English rugby union players
Rugby union players from Rugby, Warwickshire
Rugby union centres